Ytterhogdal is a locality situated in Härjedalen Municipality, Jämtland County, Sweden with 534 inhabitants in 2010. Being located in the province of Hälsingland, the village has connections to three provinces due to the municipality and county having namesake provinces outside of Ytterhogdal. European route E45 passes the village The village is located close to Sweden's geographical midpoint.

Ytterhogdal Church (Ytterhogdals kyrka) is in the Diocese of Härnösand. The church building was built in the years 1799-1809 by the builder  Johan Christian Loëll from Gävle.  It was built in stone with  a tower to the east. The sculptures in the church were made between 1839-48 by Göran Sundin (1795-1857).

Climate
Ytterhogdal has a highly variable subarctic climate (Köppen Dfc). The unpredictability of the climate is underlined by the all-time record high of  followed by an overnight air frost were recorded within three days between 12-15 June 2006.

Sports
The following sports clubs are located in Ytterhogdal:

 Ytterhogdals IK

References 

Populated places in Härjedalen Municipality
Hälsingland